The 1962 United States Senate election in Kansas was held on November 6, 1962. Incumbent Republican Senator Frank Carlson was re-elected to a third term in office over Democratic nominee Ken Smith.

Primary elections
Primary elections were held on August 7, 1962.

Democratic primary

Candidates
K. L. "Ken" Smith, unsuccessful Democratic candidate for Secretary of State of Kansas in 1960
Joseph J. Poizner

Results

Republican primary

Candidates
Frank Carlson, incumbent U.S. Senator
Joe Corpstein, farmer

Results

General election

Candidates
Frank Carlson, incumbent Senator (Republican)
George E. Kline, retired pastor from McPherson (Prohibition)
Ken L. Smith, former State Highway Department employee from Wichita (Democratic)

Results

See also 
 1962 United States Senate elections

References

Bibliography
 
 

1962
Kansas
United States Senate